Chemillé is a former commune in the Maine-et-Loire department in western France. In January 2013 it became part of the new commune Chemillé-Melay, which became part of Chemillé-en-Anjou in December 2015. Its population was 7,192 in 2019.

See also
Communes of the Maine-et-Loire department

References 

Former communes of Maine-et-Loire